Campostoma pullum is a species of fish in the family Cyprinidae. It is endemic to the United States. It is one of the 324 fish species found in Tennessee.

References
https://web.archive.org/web/20130111034246/http://www.bio.utk.edu/hulseylab/Fishlist.html

External links
FishBase: "Campostoma pullum Agassiz, 1854"

Campostoma
Fish described in 1854